Dowlatabad (also Romanized as Dowlatābād; also known as Daulatābād and Dowlatābād-e Mūghār) is a village in Garmsir Rural District, in the Central District of Ardestan County, Isfahan Province, Iran. At the 2006 census, its population was 141, in 42 families.

References 

Populated places in Ardestan County